Frabosa Soprana is a comune (municipality) in the Province of Cuneo in the Italian region Piedmont, located about  south of Turin and about  southeast of Cuneo.

Frabosa Soprana borders the following municipalities: Frabosa Sottana, Magliano Alpi, Monastero di Vasco, Montaldo di Mondovì, Ormea, and Roburent. The economy is based on winter tourism: it is connected through a chair lift to the Prato Nevoso ski resort.

Sights include the Caves of Bossea, a 2 km length karstic grottoes discovered in the 19th century, and the Monte Fantino.

References 

Cities and towns in Piedmont